In astrodynamics, an orbit equation defines the path of orbiting body  around central body  relative to , without specifying position as a function of time. Under standard assumptions, a body moving under the influence of a force, directed to a central body, with a magnitude inversely proportional to the square of the distance (such as gravity), has an orbit that is a conic section (i.e. circular orbit, elliptic orbit, parabolic trajectory, hyperbolic trajectory, or radial trajectory) with the central body located at one of the two foci, or the focus (Kepler's first law).

If the conic section intersects the central body, then the actual trajectory can only be the part above the surface, but for that part the orbit equation and many related formulas still apply, as long as it is a freefall (situation of weightlessness).

Central, inverse-square law force 

Consider a two-body system consisting of a central body of mass M and a much smaller, orbiting body of mass , and suppose the two bodies interact via a central, inverse-square law force (such as gravitation). In polar coordinates, the orbit equation can be written as

where 
  is the separation distance between the two bodies and
  is the angle that  makes with the axis of periapsis (also called the true anomaly).
 The parameter  is the constant for which  equals the acceleration of the smaller body (for gravitation,  is the standard gravitational parameter). For a given orbit, the larger , the faster the orbiting body moves in it: twice as fast if the attraction is four times as strong.
 The parameter  is the eccentricity of the orbit, and is given by

 where  is the energy of the orbit.

The value of  controls what kind of conic section the orbit is:
 when , the orbit is elliptic (circles are ellipses with );
 when , the orbit is parabolic;
 when , the orbit is hyperbolic.

while, if , the maximum value is:

If the maximum is less than the radius of the central body, then the conic section is an ellipse which is fully inside the central body and no part of it is a possible trajectory. If the maximum is more, but the minimum is less than the radius, part of the trajectory is possible:
if the energy is non-negative (parabolic or hyperbolic orbit): the motion is either away from the central body, or towards it.
if the energy is negative: the motion can be first away from the central body, up to  after which the object falls back.

If  becomes such that the orbiting body enters an atmosphere, then the standard assumptions no longer apply, as in atmospheric reentry.

Low-energy trajectories
If the central body is the Earth, and the energy is only slightly larger than the potential energy at the surface of the Earth, then the orbit is elliptic with eccentricity close to 1 and one end of the ellipse just beyond the center of the Earth, and the other end just above the surface. Only a small part of the ellipse is applicable.

The maximum height above the surface of the orbit is the length of the ellipse, minus , minus the part "below" the center of the Earth, hence twice the increase of  minus the periapsis distance. This adds up to the energy increase just mentioned. The width of the ellipse is 19 minutes times .

The part of the ellipse above the surface can be  approximated by a part of a parabola, which is obtained in a model where gravity is assumed constant. This should be distinguished from the parabolic orbit in the sense of astrodynamics, where the velocity is the escape velocity.

See also trajectory.

Categorization of orbits
Consider orbits which are at one point horizontal, near the surface of the Earth. For increasing speeds at this point the orbits are subsequently:
part of an ellipse with vertical major axis, with the center of the Earth as the far focus (throwing a stone, sub-orbital spaceflight, ballistic missile)
a circle just above the surface of the Earth (Low Earth orbit)
an ellipse with vertical major axis, with the center of the Earth as the near focus
a parabola
a hyperbola

Note that in the sequence above,  and  increase monotonically, but  first decreases from 1 to 0, then increases from 0 to infinity. The reversal is when the center of the Earth changes from being the far focus to being the near focus (the other focus starts near the surface and passes the center of the Earth). We have

Extending this to orbits which are horizontal at another height, and orbits of which the extrapolation is horizontal below the surface of the Earth, we get a categorization of all orbits, except the radial trajectories, for which, by the way, the orbit equation can not be used. In this categorization ellipses are considered twice, so for ellipses with both sides above the surface one can restrict oneself to taking the side which is lower  as the reference side, while for ellipses of which only one side is above the surface, taking that side.

See also 
Kepler's first law
Circular orbit
Elliptic orbit
Parabolic trajectory
Hyperbolic trajectory
Tsiolkovsky rocket equation
Orbital speed
Escape velocity
Celestial mechanics

Notes

References 

Orbits